Rajya Sabha elections were held in 1974, to elect members of the Rajya Sabha, Indian Parliament's upper chamber.

Elections
Elections were held in 1974 to elect members from various states.
The list is incomplete.

Members elected
The following members are elected in the elections held in 1974. They are members for the term 1974-80 and retire in year 1980, except in case of the resignation or death before the term.

State - Member - Party

Bye-elections
The following bye elections were held in the year 1974.

State - Member - Party

 Manipur - Irengbam Tompok Singh - INC (  ele  18/06/1974 term till 1978 )
 Punjab  - Niranjan Singh Talib - INC (  ele  16/07/1974 term till 1978 ) dea 28/05/1976

References

1974 elections in India
1974